Ilfov is the county that surrounds Bucharest, the capital of Romania. It used to be largely rural, but, after the fall of Communism, many of the county's villages and communes developed into high-income commuter towns, which act like suburbs or satellites of Bucharest. The gentrification of the county is continuing, with many towns in Ilfov, such as Otopeni, having some of the highest GDP per capita levels in the country.

The county has experienced rapid demographic growth in the 21st century, being the fastest growing Romanian county between 2011 and 2021.

Demographics 

It had a population (excluding Bucharest) of 542,686 at the 2022 Romanian census. 

The population density is 230.09 per km². 40% of the population commutes and works in Bucharest, although, in recent years, many industrial plants were built outside Bucharest, in Ilfov county. It has an annual growth of about 4%.

 Romanians - 96.05%
 Others - 3.95%

Geography

The county has an area of 1,584 km² and it is situated in the Romanian Plain between the Argeș River and the Ialomița River.

The main rivers that pass through the county are: Dâmbovița River, Colentina River and Gruiu River. Several lakes can be found in Ilfov county, notably Lake Cernica, Lake Snagov and Lake Căldărușani.

Neighbours

Prahova County in the north.
Ialomița County in the east.
Călărași County in the southeast.
Giurgiu County in the southwest.
Dâmbovița County in the west.

Economy
The base occupation used to be the agriculture. Nowadays, due to the economical growth in Bucharest, many companies have opened their offices, production facilities or warehouses in the nearby villages, situated in the Ilfov County, thus making it the most developed county in Romania.

The predominant industries in the county are:
 Food and beverages industry
 Textile industry
 Mechanical components industry
 Chemical industry
 Paper industry
 Furniture industry
 Rubber industry
 Electrical equipment industry
 Transport equipment industry
 Electronic and optical equipment

At Otopeni there is the main aerial transport hub in Romania - the Henri Coandă International Airport. Also all the main roads and railways leaving Bucharest pass through the county.

Tourism
The county has a large surface covered with forests and also due to its lakes, it is a frequent week-end and holiday destinations for the inhabitants of Bucharest.

Other notable touristic sites are:
 The Snagov Monastery
 The Cernica Monastery
 The Mogoșoaia Palace
 The Căldărușani Monastery
 The Ghica family palace in Moara Vlăsiei
 The Știrbei Palace in Buftea

Politics 

The Ilfov County Council, renewed at the 2020 local elections, consists of 32 counsellors, with the following party composition:

History
Most of today's Ilfov County used to be covered by Codrii Vlăsiei, a thick forest, but there were several Dacian settlements, most important being Argedava, on the right bank of the Argeș River in what is now Popești, which was the capital of king Burebista.

The thick forests were useful for retreat during the migration age because they were not easy to cross on horseback. In fact, the name of the forest means "the Forests of the Vlachs" (Romanians), a name given by the Slavs who inhabited the nearby plains.

The county was named after the Ilfov River and it appears for the first time in a 1482 donation act of voivode Vlad Călugărul to the monastery of Snagov. In earliest documents, it was known as Elhov. The name is of Slavic origin, being derived from елха, elha (alder) and possessive suffix -ov, referring to a river which flowed through an alder forest.

Administrative divisions

The county has 8 towns and 32 communes. The largest settlements by population are Popești-Leordeni, Voluntari, Chiajna, Bragadiru, Pantelimon, Buftea, Otopeni. These are the only settlements with more than 20.000 residents. Unlike most other areas of Romania, the population in Ilfov County is increasing, as many of the settlements here are seen as suburbs of Bucharest and are increasingly attracting upper class families. At the 2011 census, 43% of the county's population was defined as urban.

Popești-Leordeni is the largest settlement in Ilfov county, with a population of 53,431 at the 2021 census (representing an increase of 31,536 people since 2011, this being the largest population increase of any settlement in Romania between 2011 and 2021).

Voluntari is the second largest settlement, with a population of  47,366 at the 2021 census. It has experienced rapid population growth in recent years. There were serious debates about the city level awarded to Voluntari in 2004, as it is alleged that it was given in regard to the city's political affiliation, rather than population, development or any other objective features. Despite this, Voluntari did have a population of 30,000 at that time, and many other localities with this population have been given city-status in the past.

Buftea is associated with the cinema of Romania; as the film studios MediaPro Pictures are located in Buftea.

Otopeni was transformed into a town under the communist regime, as part of Nicolae Ceaușescu's systematization policy, with semidetached houses being replaced by four-storey blocks of flats.

Before 1972, Ilfov County used to be one of the largest counties of Romania, but parts of it were added to neighbouring counties and nowadays it is the smallest (excluding the city of Bucharest, which has a special status). Between 1981 and 1997, it was called "Sectorul Agricol Ilfov" and it was not a separate county, but subordinate to the capital.

 Periș
 Ciolpani
 Gruiu
 Nuci
 Snagov
 Grădiștea
 Moara Vlăsiei
 Balotești
 Corbeanca
 Dascălu
 Petrăchioaia
 Otopeni (town status)
 Tunari
 Ștefăneștii de Jos
 Afumați
 Voluntari (town status)
 Găneasa
 Mogoșoaia
 Buftea (town status)
 Chitila (town status)
 Dragomirești-Vale
 Chiajna
 Dobroești
 Pantelimon (town status)
 Brănești
 Ciorogârla
 Domnești
 Clinceni
 Bragadiru (town status)
 Popești-Leordeni (town status)
 Glina
 Cernica
 Cornetu
 Măgurele (town status)
 Jilava
 Berceni
 Dărăști-Ilfov
 1 Decembrie
 Vidra

Ilfov County is the only county that has its capital outside of its territorial area, in Bucharest, which is not part of the actual county. Initially, right after the 1968 reform of the public administration in communist Romania, Ilfov was a larger county, that comprised its present-day territory, the entire Giurgiu County, Bucharest and the western parts of Călărași and Ialomița counties. Later during the communist period, its territory was reduced to its current size and it became one of the sectors of Bucharest. It became again a county in 1997, when its capital was designated to be Bucharest.
However, in 2005, some plans were proposed that would merge Bucharest with 90 other communes located to up to 40 km outside the city, in Ilfov County and other nearby counties into a "metropolitan area" of Bucharest, similar to Greater London. As of 2011, these plans did not happen, while a debate on the general administrative division of Romania was under way.

Historical county

Historically, the county was located in the southern part of Greater Romania, in the southern part of the historical region of Muntenia, around and in the south of Bucharest. During the interwar years, the county, which contained the city of Bucharest, was the most populous county in Romania. Currently the territory of the county is divided among Bucharest, the current Ilfov County, Dâmbovița County, Ialomița County, Călărași County, and Giurgiu County. It was bordered to the north by the counties of Prahova and Dâmboviţa, to the west by Vlașca County, to the east by Ialomița County, and to the south by Durostor County.

Administration

The county included the cities of Bucharest and Oltenița, and originally seven administrative districts (plăși):

Plasa Băneasa, headquartered at Băneasa (with 39 villages)
Plasa Bolintin, headquartered at Bolintin (with 38 villages)
Plasa Budești, headquartered at Budești (with 31 villages)
Plasa Fierbinți, headquartered at Fierbinți (with 51 villages)
Plasa Oltenița, headquartered at Oltenița (with 25 villages)
Plasa Sărulești, headquartered at Sărulești (with 54 villages)
Plasa Vidra, headquartered at Vidra (with 28 villages)

Subsequently, the county established three more districts:Plasa Buftea, headquartered at Buftea (with 50 villages)
Plasa Domnești, headquartered at Domnești (with 44 villages)
Plasa Pantelimon, headquartered at Pantelimon (with 43 villages)

Population 
According to the 1930 census data, the county population was 999,562 inhabitants, ethnically divided as follows: 84.3% Romanians, 7.0% Jews, 2.5% Hungarians, 1.7% Romanies, 1.5% Germans, as well as other minorities. From the religious point of view, the population was 84.5% Eastern Orthodox, 7.7% Jewish, 3.7% Roman Catholic, 1.3% Greek Catholic, 1.2% Lutheran, as well as other minorities.

Urban population 
In 1930, the county's urban population was 649,429 inhabitants, comprising 77.7% Romanians, 10.8% Jews, 3.7% Hungarians, 2.2% Germans, 1.2% Romanis, as well as other minorities. From the religious point of view, the urban population was composed of 76.4% Eastern Orthodox, 11.8% Jewish, 5.6% Roman Catholic, 2.0% Greek Catholic, 1.9% Lutheran, 1.1% Reformed, as well as other minorities.

References

 
Counties of Romania
Place names of Slavic origin in Romania
1879 establishments in Romania
1938 disestablishments in Romania
1940 establishments in Romania
1950 disestablishments in Romania
1968 establishments in Romania
States and territories established in 1879
States and territories disestablished in 1938
States and territories established in 1940
States and territories disestablished in 1950
States and territories established in 1968